Search engine is a term commonly used to refer to a web search engine.

Search engine may also refer to:

Search engine (computing), an information retrieval system designed to help find information stored on a computer system
Enterprise search engine, a search engine to search enterprise documents as opposed to general web search
Search Engine (radio show), a Canadian podcast by Jesse Brown
The Search Engine, a 2012 album by DJ Food

See also
 Search algorithm or solver, software that finds a solution to a mathematical problem by searching
 Search and optimization in artificial intelligence